Jani Viander (born 18 August 1975) is a Finnish former football goalkeeper who currently works as the Lead Academy Goalkeeper Coach at Premier League side Brentford. In a long career as a player, Viander played professionally in Finland, Belgium, England, Denmark, Israel and Cyprus. He won 13 caps for Finland at international level.

Playing career
Viander played 13 times for Finland national football team. He used to play for clubs like HJK Helsinki, Bolton Wanderers and K.V. Kortrijk. At Bolton his only appearance came in the FA Cup against Stockport County. He also joined Stoke City for a season, in which he did not feature in a single match, apart from being named on the substitutes bench.

He ended his long outland journey after returning to Finland to season 2005. He joined newly promoted RoPS, Rovaniemi, but he was not capable to keep them in Finnish Premier league. RoPS were relegated to first division and Viander left club to join FF Jaro. He played against Kaiserslautern when HJK was in the UEFA Champions League in 1998.

Coaching career
Viander began his coaching career in 2010, after being named HJK Helsinki's club's full-time goalkeeping coach. The following year he was awarded the Coach of the Year award by the Veikkausliiga. Viander was named goalkeeping coach for the Finland U21 side in 2011. In the summer of 2012, Viander returned to England to take up the position of academy goalkeeping coach at Premier League side Norwich City. In April 2013, Viander returned to Brentford, to take up the role of Lead Academy Goalkeeper Coach.

Personal life
Viander married British-born model Laura Duncan in June 2008.

Career statistics

Club
Source:

International
Source:

References

External links
 Player profile on official club website 
 

Living people
1975 births
People from Tuusula
Finnish footballers
Finland international footballers
Veikkausliiga players
Israeli Premier League players
Challenger Pro League players
Cypriot First Division players
FC Jazz players
Helsingin Jalkapalloklubi players
Bolton Wanderers F.C. players
Stoke City F.C. players
Plymouth Argyle F.C. players
Aris Limassol FC players
Rovaniemen Palloseura players
AC Oulu players
FinnPa players
Brentford F.C. players
Ilves players
FF Jaro players
K.V. Kortrijk players
F.C. Ashdod players
Brentford F.C. non-playing staff
Finnish expatriate footballers
Expatriate footballers in Cyprus
Expatriate footballers in England
Expatriate footballers in Israel
Expatriate footballers in Belgium
Association football goalkeepers
Sportspeople from Uusimaa
Association football goalkeeping coaches